The North Gwent Football League (currently billed as The Swan EMS Limited North Gwent Football League for sponsorship reasons) is a football league in South Wales. The headquarters are located at The Ex-Servicemens Club, Ebbw Vale.

Area
The league's area comprises the following areas: Ebbw Vale, Tredegar, Rhymney, Maesycwmmer, Wattsville, Hafodyrynys and Llanelly Hill.

Member clubs for 2022–23 season

Premier League

Aberbargoed Town
Abercarn United reserves
Argoed
Ashdale
Brynmawr United
Cefn Fforest reserves
Fields Park
Fleur De Lys
Garnlydan
Newbridge Town
Rassau
Twyn y Ffald Blues

Division One

Aberbargoed Town reserves
Abertillery Bluebirds development
Fields Park reserves
FC Tredegar reserves
Garnlydan reserves
Nantyglo development
Nantyglo reserves
Neuadd Wen reserves
Newbridge Town development
Pentwynmawr Athletic reserves
RTB Ebbw Vale reserves
Tredegar Town development
Wattsville development
Ynysddu Welfare reserves

Promotion and relegation
The Premier Division champions (or runners-up if the champions do not meet ground criteria) may be promoted to the Gwent County League.

Champions - Top division

1970–71: – Cwmtillery 
1977–78: – Fields Park Athletic reserves
1979–80: – Fields Park Athletic reserves
1980–81: – Cwmtillery
1983–84: – Abertillery Town
1984–85: – Abertillery Town
1985–86: – Fields Park Athletic reserves
1999–2000: – Abertillery Bluebirds
2007–08: – Fleur-De-Lys Welfare
2008–09: – Fleur-De-Lys Welfare
2009–10: – 
2010–11: – Tredegar Athletic
2011–12: – Neuadd Wen
2012–13: – Cwm
2013–14: – The Oak reserves
2014–15: – Wattsville
2015–16: 
2016–17: – The Oak
2017–18: – Aberbargoed Town
2018–19: – Aberbargoed Town
2019–20: – Llanhilleth Athletic
2020–21: – No competition
2021–22: – Neuadd Wen

References

External links
North Gwent Football League

8